Loabin Hiyy Furenee is a 2008 Maldivian television series directed by Ahmed Ziya. Produced by Aisha Shadhin Shamail under Moviepeople, the series stars Ahmed Asim, Khadheeja Ibrahim Didi and Zeenath Abbas in pivotal roles.

Cast

Main
 Ahmed Asim as Ahmed Iyaz
 Khadheeja Ibrahim Didi as Maiha
 Zeenath Abbas as Zeyna
 Ahmed Ziya as Naafil
 Fathimath Azifa as Nathasha

Recurring
 Mohamed Waheed as Qadhir Easa
 Fauziyya Hassan as Zeyna's mother
 Abdulla Munaz as Ibrahim Majudhee

Guest
 Yooshau Jameel as Iyaz's brother (Episode 12)

Episodes

Soundtrack

References

Serial drama television series
Maldivian television shows